Lars Fredrik Molin (6 May 1942 – 7 February 1999) was a Swedish writer and movie director who won an Emmy Award for The Tattooed Widow in 1999. Molin was born in Järpen, Sweden, and died in Sundbyberg Municipality.

Awards 

 Prix Futura  1989
 Thaliapriset 1991
 Club 100 Prize 1989

Selected filmography 

 Buddies (Polare) (1976)
 Höjdhoppar'n (1981)
 Sommarmord (1994)

References

External links 

 
 

1942 births
1999 deaths
People from Åre Municipality
Swedish film directors
Sommar (radio program) hosts